Jérémy Chardy and Henri Kontinen were the defending champions, but Chardy chose not to participate this year. 

Pierre-Hugues Herbert and Nicolas Mahut won the title, defeating Kontinen and Jan-Lennard Struff in the final, 7–6(7–5), 4–6, [10–7].

Seeds

Draw

Qualifying

Seeds

Qualifiers
  Henri Kontinen /  Jan-Lennard Struff

Qualifying draw

References

External links
 Main draw
 Qualifying draw

Doubles